The Porto class of Coastal tugboats consists of nine units operated by the Marina Militare Italiana, named as Rimorchiatore Costiero.

Ships
These units are usable for relief, rescue and fire fighting.

References

External links
 Ships Marina Militare website

Ships built in Italy
Auxiliary tugboat classes
Auxiliary ships of the Italian Navy
1985 ships